Lori Gruen is an American philosopher, ethicist, and author who is the William Griffin Professor of Philosophy at Wesleyan University in Middletown, Connecticut. Gruen is also Professor of Science in Society, and Professor of Feminist, Gender and Sexuality Studies at Wesleyan.

A scholar specializing in animal ethics, Gruen is the author of several books, including Ethics and Animals: An Introduction (2011) and Entangled Empathy: An Alternative Ethic for Our Relationships with Animals (2015). She is the creator of first100chimps.wesleyan.edu, a memorial for the first 100 chimpanzees used in research in the United States.

Gruen has written for Time magazine, Al Jazeera, and the Washington Post.

Career
After obtaining a BA in philosophy from the University of Colorado Boulder in 1983, Gruen spent a year as a graduate student at the University of Arizona, then worked for the animal liberation movement. In 1987 she published her first book, Animal Liberation: A Graphic Guide, written with Peter Singer and illustrated by David Hine, then returned to the University of Colorado Boulder in 1989, where she completed her PhD in 1994.

Her teaching posts have included the University of British Columbia (1991–1992); Lafayette College (1994–1997); the University of North Carolina at Chapel Hill (1997); and Stanford University (1994–1999). After joining Wesleyan University in 2000 as an assistant professor, she became chair of the philosophy department in 2010, professor in the feminist, gender and sexuality studies program in 2011, and the William Griffin Professor of Philosophy in 2015. She also co-coordinates a summer fellowship program in animal studies at Wesleyan.

Hypatia
Gruen served as the co-editor of Hypatia, the feminist philosophy journal, from 2008 to 2010, and as a member of its board of associate editors from 2010 to 2015. She edited two special editions of the journal: 25th Anniversary: Feminist Legacies/Feminist Futures (2010) and, with Kari Weil, Animal Others (2012). The journal published a symposium in 2017 on Gruen's idea of "entangled empathy".

In April 2017, Hypatia published a peer-reviewed article comparing transgender and transracial identities. New York magazine reported that Gruen was a lead signatory of an open letter calling for the article's retraction. Hypatia'''s editor-in-chief stood by the publication of the article.

Selected works
 (1987) with Peter Singer and David Hine. 
 (1994) with Dale Jamieson (eds.). 
 (1997) with George E. Panichas (eds.). 
(2007) with Laura Grabel and Peter Singer (eds.). 
 (2011) 
(2012) with Dale Jemieson and Christopher Schlottmann (eds.). 
 (2014) (ed.) 
(2014) with Carol J. Adams (eds.). 
(2015) 
 (2018) with Fiona Probyn-Rapsey (eds.). 
(2018) (ed.) 

References

Further reading
Bekoff, Marc (30 April 2014). "The Ethics of Captivity: A New Book Covers All the Issues", Psychology Today.
Tuvel, Rebecca (2016). "The Ethics of Captivity ed. by Lori Gruen (review)", philoSOPHIA'', 6(1), Winter 2016, 133–136.

External links
 
 Faculty page at Wesleyan University

1962 births
21st-century American philosophers
21st-century American women
American animal welfare scholars
American ethicists
American political philosophers
American women philosophers
Animal ethicists
Feminist philosophers
Living people
Wesleyan University faculty